The Icelandic Film Centre (IFC)  is a public institution that was established in 2001.

The Centre runs the Icelandic Film Database containing detailed information on Icelandic films and filmmakers, including stills, trailers and posters.

References

External Links 

 

Government agencies of Iceland
Cinema of Iceland